Leslie Roy Hill (born 27 April 1884, Adelaide, South Australia, died 15 December 1952, Adelaide, South Australia) was an Australian first-class cricketer.  A right-handed batsman and right-arm fast-medium bowler, he made eighteen appearances for South Australia.  He made his top-score of 123 against New South Wales in his penultimate first-class match.

Hill also played Australian rules football for Norwood in the South Australian Football League and was a member of their 1904 and 1907 premiership teams.

References

External links
 
 

1884 births
1952 deaths
Australian cricketers
South Australia cricketers
Australian rules footballers from South Australia
Norwood Football Club players
Cricketers from Adelaide